Phyllonorycter juncei is a moth of the family Gracillariidae. It is known from the Canary Islands and Madeira.

The larvae feed on Genista tenera, Teline maderensis, Teline stenopetala and Spartium junceum. They mine the leaves of their host plant. They create a lower-surface tentiform mine. The mine has strong, transverse folds, that cause the tip of the leaflet to strongly curve downwards. The frass is concentrated in the distal corner of the mine. Pupation takes place within the mine.

Subspecies
Phyllonorycter juncei juncei (Canary Islands)
Phyllonorycter juncei madeirae Deschka, 1976 (Madeira)

References

juncei
Insects of the Canary Islands
Moths of Africa
Moths described in 1908